Phillip E. Tyrrell (June 19, 1932 – April 9, 2012) was an American politician in the state of Iowa.

Tyrrell was born in Anthon, Iowa. He was an insurance agent. He served in the Iowa House of Representatives from 1979 to 2003, as a Republican. He died in 2012.

References

1932 births
2012 deaths
People from Woodbury County, Iowa
Businesspeople from Iowa
Republican Party members of the Iowa House of Representatives
20th-century American businesspeople